Dirt! is the sixth album  by the Canadian comedy music group The Arrogant Worms, released in 1999.

Track listing
All tracks by The Arrogant Worms
 "A Man Has Needs" – 3:46
 "Steel Drivin' Man" – 4:03
 "Great to Be a Nerd" – 1:57
 "Celine Dion" – 3:14
 "Rocks and Trees" – 1:58
 "Gaelic Song" – 2:56
 "Wong's Chinese Buffet" – 2:15
 "I Am Cow" – 2:02
 "Johnny Came Home Headless" – 2:57
 "Heimlich Maneuver" – 3:19
 "Scary Ned" – 3:19
 "Sponges" – 2:18
 "Log in to You" – 3:59
 "Winnebago" (CD bonus track; not included on cassette release) – 6:23

Personnel
Andrew "The Steamroller" Affleck – bass, accordion
The Arrogant Worms – arranger
Craig Bignell – banjo, percussion, drums
Al Cross – drums
Stephen Fearing – acoustic guitar
Richard Flohil – screenplay
Jeff May – artwork, video editor
Jon Park Wheeler – guitar, mandolin
Don Reed – fiddle
Andy Thompson – keyboards, producer, mastering, mixing
Terry Tufts – electric guitar

References

1999 albums
The Arrogant Worms albums